Anderson is a city in and the county seat of Anderson County, South Carolina, United States. The population was 28,106 at the 2020 census, and the city was the center of an urbanized area of 75,702. It is one of the principal cities in the Greenville-Anderson-Mauldin metropolitan statistical area, which had a population of 824,112 at the 2010 census. It is included in the larger Greenville-Spartanburg-Anderson, South Carolina combined statistical area, with a total population of 1,266,995, at the 2010 census. Anderson is the smallest of the three primary cities that make up the Upstate region, and is nicknamed the "Electric City" and the "Friendliest City in South Carolina."

History

Anderson Court House

Cherokee first settled the area of what is today the city of Anderson. During the American Revolution, the Cherokee sided with the British. After the American Revolutionary War, the Cherokee's land was acquired as war reparations and colonized. In 1791, the South Carolina Legislature created the Washington District, which comprised Greenville, Anderson, Oconee, and Pickens Counties. The Washington District was then divided into Greenville and Pendleton districts. Anderson, Pickens, and Oconee comprised the newly created Pendleton district. Anderson was settled in 1826 and incorporated in 1828 as Anderson Court House, separate from the Pendleton district. The name Anderson is in honor of Robert Anderson, who fought in the American Revolutionary War and also explored the Anderson region in the mid-18th century. Anderson District (later Anderson County after 1867) was also established in 1826 out of the Pendleton district.

In 1851, the Johnson Female Seminary was established in Anderson as the first college of the town, and was named after William Bullein Johnson. One year later, the seminary was renamed Johnson University. During the American Civil War, Johnson University was closed and converted into a Confederate treasury. On May 1, 1865, Union forces invaded Anderson looking for the Confederate treasury. The treasury office of Anderson was ransacked by Union forces, and the main building of Johnson University was used as a Union headquarters. A minor skirmish erupted at the Battle of Anderson, leading to two Union casualties. After the war, a Union garrison was stationed in Anderson.

The Electric City

Anderson became one of the first cities in the Southeastern United States to have electricity. Electricity to Anderson was established by William C. Whitner in 1895 at a hydroelectric plant on the Rocky River, giving the city the name the Electric City. Anderson also became the first city in the world to supply a cotton gin by electricity. In 1895, Anderson Court House was renamed to Anderson. In 1897, Whitner's plant was upgraded with a 10,000-volt generating station at Portman Shoals. Whitner's power plant at Portman Shoals became the first hydroelectric plant in the United States to generate high voltage without step-up transformers . The Portman Dam was swept away in 1901, forcing Anderson into darkness until it was rebuilt in 1902.

Anderson University
In 1911, Anderson College was established by the Anderson Chamber of Commerce. Anderson College was a successor to the Johnson Female Seminary and is affiliated with the South Carolina Baptist Convention, in particular the First Baptist Church of Anderson. Anderson College became a co-educational, two-year junior college in 1930, and in 2006, it became Anderson University.

Geography

Anderson is located in the northwest corner of South Carolina on the Piedmont plateau. Anderson is a 1-hour drive from the Blue Ridge Mountains and a 4-hour drive from the South Carolina coast. Anderson lies roughly at the midpoint of the busy I-85 corridor between Atlanta and Charlotte.

Cityscape

Historic districts
 Anderson College Historic District
 Anderson Downtown Historic District
 Anderson Historic District
 McDuffie Street Historic District
 South Boulevard Historic District
 Westside Historic District
 Whitner Street Historic District

Other historical locations

 Caldwell-Johnson-Morris Cottage
 Denver Downs Farmstead 
 Kennedy Street School
 North Anderson Historic District
 Dr. Samuel Marshall Orr House
 Ralph John Ramer House

Parks
It is home to the Anderson University Trojans.
Anderson Sports and Entertainment Center — A  area, it includes the Anderson Civic Center, a  facility, as well as one of South Carolina's largest amphitheaters that can accommodate 15,000 people, a huge castle-like play structure with play equipment, a  sports center with seven baseball/softball fields, three soccer fields, a disc golf course, and eight tennis courts. The lake has a park, picnic shelters, and miles of nature trail. The center is Anderson's largest recreational area.

Economy
Anderson is home to the largest Glen Raven, Inc. manufacturing center facility, which focuses on manufacturing Sunbrella fabrics. Anderson's economy revolves around manufacturing. It has over 230 manufacturers, including 22 international companies. In the county, Anderson has a thriving business climate. Its top major industries  include manufacturers of automotive products, metal products, industrial machinery, plastics, publishing, and textiles. Two industries that many times interconnect are the plastic and automotive sectors. More than 27 BMW suppliers are the Upstate region, which is recognized internationally as an automotive supplier hub. The plastics industry has a strong presence in the Upstate, with 244 plastic companies located within the 10 counties of the state's northwest corner. Anderson County, in particular, has 11 automotive suppliers, and is a major player in the plastic industry, with 27 plastics companies located within its borders.

Hospitals
AnMed Health is one of the top employers in the county, and the primary healthcare network for Anderson. AnMed Health Medical Center is the main medical facility, offering all the amenities of a standard hospital, as well as a heart and vascular center, and stroke/neurological center. Located 2.5 miles north of the facility is the AnMed Health Campus, which includes a women's and children's hospital, minor care, cancer center, speech and occupational therapy, and more. The AnMed Rehabilitation Hospital is located between the two facilities. AnMed has recently received national attention being awarded the "National Presidents Circle Award," and the "American College of Cardiology Foundation’s 2012 NCDR ACTION Registry–GWTG Platinum Performance Achievement Award."

In addition to these three network hospitals, AnMed also operates a number of smaller facilities throughout the city and county that range from a free clinic and minor care to doctor's offices.

Education
The city of Anderson is served by the Anderson County School System (specifically, Anderson School District Five). The school district has 11 elementary schools, five middle schools, and two high schools. Anderson is home to Anderson University, a private university with roughly 3,900 undergraduate and graduate students.

Elementary schools
 Calhoun Academy of the Arts
 Centerville Elementary
 Concord Elementary
 Homeland Park Primary School
 McLees Academy of Leadership
 Midway Elementary School of Science and Engineering
 Nevitt Forest Community School of Innovation
 New Prospect STEM Academy
 North Pointe Elementary School
 Varennes Academy of Communications and Technology
 Whitehall Elementary, A Global Communication School

Middle schools
 McCants Middle School
 Southwood Academy of the Arts
 Robert Anderson Middle School
 Glenview Middle School

High schools
 Westside High School
 T. L. Hanna High School
 Anderson Five Career Campus

Private schools
 Anderson Christian School (PK-12)
 First Presbyterian Church Day School (PK)
 Grace Kindergarten 
Montessori School of Anderson (PK-12)
 New Covenant School (PK-12)
 Learn Upstate Hybrid Academy (PK-12)
 Oakwood Christian School (K-12)
 St. Joseph Catholic School (PK-8)
 Temple Christian Academy (K-12)
 West Anderson Christian Academy (PK/K)

Higher education
 Anderson University
 Tri-County Technical College

Library
Anderson has a public library, a branch of the Anderson County Library System.

Transportation

Airport

Anderson is served by Anderson County Regional Airport (IATA: AND, ICAO: KAND). The airport also has helipads. The airport has no control tower, but is able to accommodate regional jet aircraft. In addition, the airport has a small terminal.

Roads and highways
Anderson has five signed exits on I-85, currently the city's only freeway. Several notable highways pass through the city, including U.S. Route 76 and U.S. Route 178 co-signed along Clemson Boulevard, also known as SC-Bus 28, and U.S. Route 29 and Route 187 leading to Hartwell, Georgia, to the south and Greenville to the north.

In 2011, construction began on a new east–west connector that is about 3 mi long between Clemson Boulevard and South Carolina Highway 81. On August 16, 2010, the connector was voted to have four lanes with turn and bike lanes, and a completion date set in October 2012.

On November, 8th, 2013, the East-West Parkway formally opened to traffic.

Public transit
Anderson has four bus routes that travel to most major areas of the city, running every hour. The city also receives service from Clemson Area Transit (CATS) via the 4U route. The city uses both newer hybrid buses and older style trolleys resembling Anderson's old streetcars. Inter-city bus travel is available through Greyhound Lines.

One of the Southeast High Speed Rail Corridor alternatives for a Charlotte - Greenville - Atlanta route includes a stop at Anderson. This would mark the first time that passenger rail reached Anderson, since the passing of Piedmont and Northern Railway in ca. 1947 and the Blue Ridge Railway in ca. 1951 from Anderson.

Demographics

2020 census

As of the 2020 United States census, there were 28,106 people, 11,412 households, and 6,112 families residing in the city.

2000 census 
At the census of 2000,  25,514 people, 10,641 households, and 6,299 families were residing in the city. The population density was 1,843.7 people/sq mi (711.8/km2). The 12,068 housing units averaged 872.1/sq mi (336.7/km2). The racial makeup of the city was 63.12% White, 34.01% African American, 0.22% Native American, 0.78% Asian American, 0.72% from other races, and 1.16% from two or more races. Hispanics or Latinos of any race were 1.48% of the population.

Government
Anderson is governed using the mayor-council system. The mayor is elected at-large. The city council consists of eight members; six are elected from districts and the other two are elected at-large.

Notable people
Kip Anderson, Southern soul and blues artist, recorded his first record on Vee Jay Records. The Beatles first recorded on the Vee Jay label. His last job was a DJ at WANS radio in Anderson.
Chadwick Boseman (1976–2020), actor (Black Panther, 42, Get on Up, Captain America: Civil War, Avengers: Endgame)
Lou Brissie, Major League Baseball player with Philadelphia Athletics and Cleveland Indians from 1947 to 1953
Milford Burriss, state legislator
Yung Carter, record producer
Guy Davenport, novelist, poet, and scholar
Shaun Ellis, professional football player
Bailey Hanks, winner of MTV's Legally Blonde the Musical: The Next Elle Woods
Brandon Micheal Hall, actor (God Friended Me)
Preston Jones, professional football player
James "Radio" Kennedy, the movie Radio was based on his life with T.L. Hanna High School in Anderson, SC.
Rafael Little, professional football player, Canadian Football League
Johnny Mann, arranger, composer, conductor, entertainer, and recording artist; honorary alumnus (D. Hum.) from Anderson University
Adam Minarovich, actor, screenwriter and film director.
Charles Murphey (1799–1861), United States congressman from Georgia
Larry Nance, retired NBA basketball player with the Phoenix Suns and Cleveland Cavaliers, three-time All-Star
James Lawrence Orr, former governor of South Carolina and speaker of the United States House of Representatives
Lu Parker, Miss South Carolina USA 1994, Miss USA 1994, television personality and journalist
Wesley Quinn, dancer/singer in popular boy band V Factory
Jim Rice, professional baseball player with Boston Red Sox from 1974 to 1989, member of National Baseball Hall of Fame, class of 2009
Terence Roberts, first African-American mayor of Anderson
Lily Strickland, composer and painter
Jessica Stroup, actress on television series 90210 and The Following
Jack Swilling, generally recognized as the pioneer founder of Phoenix, Arizona
Ben Taylor, Negro league professional baseball player from 1908 to 1929, manager/coach from 1929 to 1940, member of National Baseball Hall of Fame, Class of 2006
Candy Jim Taylor, Negro league professional baseball player and manager
Steel Arm Johnny Taylor, Negro league professional baseball player
George Webster, former AFL and NFL football player, two-time All American at Michigan State University, 1965–66

Sister cities
Anderson has two sister cities, as designated by Sister Cities International:
  Carrickfergus, County Antrim, Northern Ireland, United Kingdom
  Comhairle nan Eilean Siar, Scotland, UK

See also 
 List of municipalities in South Carolina

References

External links

 
 

 
Cities in South Carolina
Cities in Anderson County, South Carolina
County seats in South Carolina
Populated places established in 1777